A total solar eclipse occurred on March 4, 1802. A solar eclipse occurs when the Moon passes between Earth and the Sun, thereby totally or partly obscuring the image of the Sun for a viewer on Earth. A total solar eclipse occurs when the Moon's apparent diameter is larger than the Sun's, blocking all direct sunlight, turning day into darkness. Totality occurs in a narrow path across Earth's surface, with the partial solar eclipse visible over a surrounding region thousands of kilometres wide.
The eclipse was visible in Indonesia, Papua New Guinea, Australia, New Zealand and Antarctica, while the totality was seen in Australia and Antarctica.

See also 
 List of solar eclipses in the 19th century

References

External links 
 Google interactive maps
 Solar eclipse data

1802 03 04
1802 in science
1802 03 04
March 1802 events